Platytheca is a genus of small shrubs in the family Elaeocarpaceae from the south-west of Western Australia.  The genus was formally described by Joachim Steetz,  his description published in Plantae Preissianae in 1845.

Species include:
Platytheca anasima R.Butcher 
Platytheca galioides Steetz
Platytheca juniperina Domin Platytheca'' sp. Sabina (G.J. & B.J. Keighery)

References

Elaeocarpaceae
Oxalidales of Australia
Rosids of Western Australia
Elaeocarpaceae genera